Malé Kozmálovce is a village and municipality in the Levice District in the Nitra Region of Slovakia.

History
The Magyar population founded the settlement before the final and decisive victory of Magyars in Pozsony Battle (at the beginning of 10th century). In historical records the village was first mentioned in 1372.

The Timotheus Society (belonging to Calvinist-Reformed Church) founded an orphanage. The orphanage was abolished by Soviet attacks and the ethnical crimes committed against Magyar population following the 1945 Kassa-Kosice declaration by National-Socialist Party of CSR.

Geography
The village lies at an altitude of 175 metres and covers an area of 9.222 km². It has a population of about 370 people.

Ethnicity
At present - the village is approximately 88% Slovak, 12% Magyar, following the ethnical crimes committed following the "Benes Decrets" by expelling or deporting the majority of Magyar population.

Facilities
The village has a public library and football pitch.

External links

https://web.archive.org/web/20070513023228/http://www.statistics.sk/mosmis/eng/run.html

Villages and municipalities in Levice District